Minoti Desai (born 15 March 1968) is a former Test and One Day International cricketer who represented India. He is a left-handed batsman and bowls left-arm orthodox. He played one Test and one ODI for India.

She holds the national record for highest score ( 150 ) runs in the finals of senior national tournament; playing for Indian railways in 1988 Chennai Nationals she scored 150 runs against Karnataka.
She also holds record for being the Best batswoman in three consecutive Junior nationals in the years 1985 -1987.
She is the only woman cricketer who has been captain of both Senior and Junior combined Indian university teams. 
In her captaincy junior combined university team was National champion in 1987 kottayam nationals.
She was employed by western railways -she left railways in the year 1992 to play for her own state Madhya pradesh and Central zone.
Under her captaincy MP was winner in Senior nationals held at Delhi in 1993.
She retired from cricket at the age of 25 years.
She is currently working for ministry of finance.

References

1968 births
India women One Day International cricketers
India women Test cricketers
Indian women cricketers
Living people
Madhya Pradesh women cricketers
Cricketers from Indore
Sportswomen from Madhya Pradesh
20th-century Indian women
20th-century Indian people